Celebration is an American psychedelic soul band based out of Baltimore, Maryland, United States. Formed in 2004 the band is composed of singer Katrina Ford, multi-instrumentalist Sean Antanaitis and drummer David Bergander, with a number of additional rotating members: Walker Teret plays bass, sometimes guitar, percussion and backing vocals; Tony Drummond plays keys, percussion and backing vocals; Tommy Rouse plays guitar and percussion.

History
In the beginning, the band's sound as a three-piece was centered on the unique output provided by all the instruments played by Antanaitis in the studio as well as live. He would play all of the music in the band including organ, Moog bass pedals, guitorgan and electric keys, leaving Ford on vocals and Bergander on drums. Their first two records were produced with David Sitek of TV on the Radio. In addition to producing, Sitek also contributed guitar parts and synths. Other noteworthy members on the albums include Martin Perna and Stewart Bogle who contributed flute and sax into the mix.

Singer Katrina Ford also performed backing vocals on TV on the Radio's songs "Staring at the Sun" from their album Desperate Youth, Blood Thirsty Babes and "Wolf Like Me" off their album Return to Cookie Mountain.

Self produced Electric Tarot: Hello Paradise (Friends Records) is the result of home/hometown recording with additional members.  The tarot theme is woven into the meanings and content of the music itself.

Members
 Katrina Ford (Vocals, Percussion)
 Sean Antanaitis (Guitar, Guitorgan, Organ, Wurlitzer, Piano, Moog Pedal Bass, electronics)
 David Bergander (Drums, Percussion)

Discography

Albums
 Celebration – (October, 2005)
 The Modern Tribe – (October, 2007)
 Hello Paradise – (December, 2010)
 Albumin – (August, 2014)
 Wounded Healer – (June, 2017)

Singles
 "Diamonds" – (December 5, 2005)
 "War" – (February 20, 2006)
 "New Skin" – (May 22, 2006)

Appearances
 David Bergander and Sean Antanaitis appear on the album Anywhere I Lay My Head by Scarlett Johansson.
 Katrina Ford appears on the album Villainaire by The Dead Science, Maximum Balloon by David Andrew Sitek  and on the albums Desperate Youth, Bloodthirsty Babes, Return to Cookie Mountain and Dear Science, all by TV on the Radio.  She appears on the song In The Fall on the 2010 EP In The Fall by Future Islands. She also appears on the song Caged Bird on the 2010 album Where Did the Night Fall by UNKLE.

References

External links

 [ allmusic]
 City Paper of Baltimore
 4AD's Celebration page
 Sound.wav Music Interview

Musical groups from Baltimore
4AD artists
Bella Union artists